Jay Rosehill (born July 16, 1985) is a Canadian former professional ice hockey left winger who played for the Toronto Maple Leafs and the Philadelphia Flyers of the National Hockey League (NHL), and the Manchester Storm of the Elite Ice Hockey League (EIHL). Rosehill was mostly known as an enforcer in hockey. He was selected by the Tampa Bay Lightning in the 2003 NHL Entry Draft.

Playing career
Rosehill was selected in the seventh round of the 2003 NHL Entry Draft (227th overall) by the Tampa Bay Lightning. He continued to play for the Olds Grizzlys of the AJHL in the 2003–04 season. The next season, he played for University of Minnesota Duluth of the Western Collegiate Hockey Association.  For most of the next four seasons, he was placed in the Tampa Bay Lightning farm system, playing for both Johnstown Chiefs of the ECHL and the Springfield Falcons of the American Hockey League in 2005-06 and 2006–07.  Due to new Tampa Bay farm system affiliations, he played for Mississippi Sea Wolves of the ECHL and the Norfolk Admirals of the American Hockey League in 2007-08 & 2008–09.  On March 10, 2009, he was traded to the Toronto Maple Leafs organization for future considerations.

Rosehill started the 2009–10 NHL season on the starting roster for the Toronto Maple Leafs, and in his third game, he scored his first NHL goal against Marc-André Fleury of the Pittsburgh Penguins.

After joining the Norfolk Admirals on a try-out during the 2012–13 season, Rosehill was signed by NHL affiliate, the Anaheim Ducks, on a one-year contract on January 16, 2013. Rosehill was traded on April 1, 2013, to the Philadelphia Flyers in exchange for forward Harry Zolnierczyk. Two weeks later, Rosehill signed a two-year contract extension with the Flyers worth $1.35 million. The Flyers waived Rosehill at the beginning of the 2014–15 season. After he cleared waivers, the Flyers sent him to the Lehigh Valley Phantoms where he spent the entire season. An unrestricted free agent following the season, Rosehill signed a one-year AHL contract with Lehigh Valley.

In the summer of 2016, Rosehill moved to the UK's EIHL, signing for Braehead Clan. After one season with Braehead, Rosehill remained in the UK Elite League to follow Ryan Finnerty to Manchester Storm in May 2017.

Career statistics

References

External links
 

1985 births
Living people
Braehead Clan players
Canadian expatriate ice hockey players in England
Canadian expatriate ice hockey players in Scotland
Canadian expatriate ice hockey players in the United States
Canadian ice hockey defencemen
Canadian ice hockey left wingers
Ice hockey people from Alberta
Johnstown Chiefs players
Lehigh Valley Phantoms players
Manchester Storm (2015–) players
Minnesota Duluth Bulldogs men's ice hockey players
Mississippi Sea Wolves players
Norfolk Admirals players
Olds Grizzlys players
People from Olds, Alberta
Philadelphia Flyers players
Springfield Falcons players
Tampa Bay Lightning draft picks
Toronto Maple Leafs players
Toronto Marlies players